Irvin Cardona (born 8 August 1997) is a French professional footballer who plays as a forward for German  club Augsburg.

Club career

Monaco
Cardona made his professional debut on 2 February 2017 in the Coupe de France Round of 32 against FC Chambly. He replaced Pierre-Daniel N'Guinda after 78 minutes in a 5–4 away win.
He made his Ligue 1 debut ten days later coming on for Radamel Falcao to play the last 9 minutes of a 5–0 home thrashing of Metz.

Loan to Cercle Brugge
On 18 July 2017, Cardona extended his Monaco contract until 2021 and was immediately loaned to the club's Belgian satellite club Cercle Brugge for the following season. Although he missed a couple of weeks by an injury, he still was a major key player in the team that became champion of the 2017–18 Belgian First Division B. He scored an important penalty in the last minute in the champion's game against Beerschot-Wilrijk. He was voted second best player in the league, after teammate Xavier Mercier.

Brest
On 12 August 2019, Cardona signed with Ligue 1 promotees Brest. On 13 September 2020, he scored an acrobatic volley goal in a 2–0 away win over Dijon which was described as a "Puskás Award contender."

Augsburg
On 18 January 2023, Cardona signed a contract with German club Augsburg until 30 June 2027.

Personal life
Born in France, Cardona is of Maltese descent.

Career statistics

Club

Honours
Monaco
Ligue 1: 2016–17

Cercle Brugge
Belgian First Division B: 2017–18

References

External links

1997 births
Living people
French people of Maltese descent
French footballers
Footballers from Nîmes
Association football forwards
France youth international footballers
Ligue 1 players
Belgian Pro League players
Challenger Pro League players
Bundesliga players
AS Monaco FC players
Cercle Brugge K.S.V. players
Stade Brestois 29 players
FC Augsburg players
French expatriate footballers
French expatriate sportspeople in Belgium
Expatriate footballers in Belgium
French expatriate sportspeople in Germany
Expatriate footballers in Germany